Argyroxiphium sandwicense, the Hawaiʻi silversword, or hinahina is a species of silversword. It is endemic to Hawaii. The two subspecies are separated by geography. Both subspecies are rare, threatened and federally protected.

 Haleakala silversword (A. sandwicense subsp. macrocephalum) is found on the mountain Haleakalā on the island of Maui at elevations above . It is a federally listed threatened species.
 Mauna Kea silversword (A. sandwicense subsp. sandwicense) is found on the mountain Mauna Kea on the Hawaii Island at elevations above . It is a federally listed endangered species. As few as 40 individuals are left.

Reproduction
The silversword flowers only once in its lifespan of 20 to 90 years.

Natural History
One of the reasons that the silversword is now an endangered species is the introduction of foreign hoofed mammals (ungulates) by European colonizers. As the population of ungulates (most notably sheep) grew, the population of silversword decreased. (Robichaux, 1997)

Threats 
One study found that it may not survive climate change.

References

External links
 

sandwicense
Endemic flora of Hawaii